Turpentine tree may refer to:
 Pistacia terebinthus, native to the Mediterranean region
 Pistacia atlantica, native to the Middle East, the Maghreb, the Canary Islands and Southeast Europe
 Pistacia eurycarpa, native to West Asia
 Canarium australianum (brown cudgeree), native to Australia and Papua New Guinea
 Gardenia pyriformis, native to northern Australia
 Syncarpia glomulifera, native to Australia
 Bursera simaruba, native to the tropical and subtropical Americas, called "turpentine" in the Virgin Islands

See also
 Scrub turpentine
 Turpentine bush